Missing Witnesses is a 1937 American crime film directed by William Clemens and written by Kenneth Gamet and Don Ryan. The film stars John Litel, Dick Purcell, Jean Dale, Sheila Bromley, Ben Welden and William Haade. The film was released by Warner Bros. on December 11, 1937.

Plot

Cast 
 John Litel as Inspector Lane
 Dick Purcell as 'Bull' Regan
 Jean Dale as Mary Norton
 Sheila Bromley as Gladys Wagner
 Ben Welden as Wagner
 William Haade as Emmet White
 Raymond Hatton as 'Little Joe' Macey
 Harland Tucker as Ward Sturgis
 Jack Mower as Detective Butler
 Jack Harron as Harris
 Michael Mark as Hartman
 Earl Gunn as Chivvy Predo
 Louis Natheaux as Heinie Dodds

References

External links 
 
 
 
 

1937 films
Warner Bros. films
American crime films
1937 crime films
Films directed by William Clemens
American black-and-white films
1930s English-language films
1930s American films
Films scored by Bernhard Kaun